PCP site 2 is a binding site that was identified as a high-affinity target for phencyclidine (PCP), an anesthetic and dissociative hallucinogen that acts primarily as an NMDA receptor antagonist. The site is distinct from the PCP binding site on the NMDA receptor (otherwise known as PCP site 1) and the common/main sites on the monoamine transporters. It is associated with monoamine reuptake inhibition, and it has been suggested that the site may be an allosteric/regulatory site of the monoamine transporters.

RTI-4793-14 (HBMP), a ligand with high affinity for the PCP site 2 and high selectivity for this site over the PCP site 1, has been developed. Similarly to PCP, RTI-4793-1 inhibits monoamine reuptake with moderate potency, but unlike PCP, has very low potency as an NMDA receptor antagonist. It shows a profile of a serotonin–norepinephrine–dopamine reuptake inhibitor (SNDRI). Although this was inferred to be related to binding to the PCP site 2, subsequent research found that RTI-4793-14 also has considerable affinity for the DAT; it does not appear to have been characterized at the SERT or NET, but may bind to them similarly, and these interactions could potentially explain its monoamine reuptake inhibition as an alternative to the PCP site 2.

Activity profiles

References

Monoamine reuptake inhibitors